Life Is Good or Life's Good may refer to:

Music

Albums 
Life Is Good (Emilio album) or the title song, 1995
Life Is Good (Flogging Molly album) or the title song, 2017
Life Is Good (Gord Bamford album) or the title song, 2004
Life Is Good (LFO album) or the title song, 2001
Life Is Good (Nas album), 2012
Life Is Good: The Best of Stellar Kart, 2009

Songs 
"Life Is Good" (song), by Future and Drake, 2020
 "Life Is Good", by Espen Lind from This Is Pop Music, 2000
 "Life Is Good", by A Great Big World from the soundtrack of the film The Star, 2017
 "Life Is Good", by Ministry from The Last Sucker, 2007
 "Life Is Good", by Ringo Starr from What's My Name, 2019
 "Life Is Good", by Stellar Kart from All Gas. No Brake., 2005

Other uses 
 Life Is Good (horse) (foaled 2018), an American Thoroughbred horse
 Life Is Good Company, an American clothing retailer
 Life's Good (film), a 2022 Bollywood drama
 "Life's Good", slogan of the Korean electronics conglomerate LG Corporation

See also
 "Life's Been Good", a 1978 song by Joe Walsh
 Life's Too Good, a 1988 album by the Sugarcubes
 The Good Life (disambiguation)